A Trap for Lonely Man is a 1990 Soviet comedy film directed by Alexey Korenev.

Plot 
The film tells about a man whose wife was missing, which forced him to turn to the police. Suddenly, a local cure brings to him a woman who calls herself his wife, and he claims that he never saw her.

Cast 
 Nikolai Karachentsov as Daniel Courban, Wife-loser
 Yury Yakovlev as Police inspector
 Irina Shmeleva
 Venyamin Smekhov as Curé
 Innokentiy Smoktunovsky as Merlouche, artist
 Elena Koreneva as Doctor
 Sergey Migitsko as Policeman

References

External links 
 

1990 films
1990s Russian-language films
Soviet comedy films
1990 comedy films